Social security in Germany is codified on the Sozialgesetzbuch (SGB), or the "Social Code", contains 12 main parts, including the following,

Unemployment insurance and public employment agencies (SGB II and III)
Health insurance (SGB V)
Old age, widow's/widower's, orphans and disability pension insurance (SGB VI)
Invalidity insurance (SGB VII and IX)
Child support (SGB VIII)
Social care (SGB XI)

Unemployment

Unemployment benefit I 

The unemployment benefit I in Germany is also known as the unemployment insurance. The insurance is administered by the Bundesagentur für Arbeit (Federal Employment Agency, BA) and funded by employee and employer contributions. This in stark contrast to FUTA in the US and other systems; where only employers make contributions. Participation (and thus contributions) are generally mandatory for both employee and employer. All workers with a regular employment contract, except freelancers and certain civil servants, contribute to the system. Since 2006, certain previously excluded workers have been able to opt into the system on a voluntary basis.

The system is financed by contributions from employees and employers. Employees pay 1.2% of their gross salary below the social security threshold and employers pay 1.2% contribution on top of the salary paid to the employee. The contribution level was reduced from 1.3% for employees and employers during the COVID-19 pandemic. Contributions are paid only on earnings up to the social security ceiling (2021: 7,100 EUR in western Germany and 6,700 EUR in the former GDR). The system is largely self-financed but also receives a subsidy from the state to run the Job centers.

Unemployed workers are entitled to:
 Living allowance known as unemployment benefit
 Help in finding work
 Training

Unemployed benefit is paid to workers who have contributed at least during 12 months in a 30 month period preceding their loss of a job. The allowance is paid for 12 months to claimants below the age of 50. Above the age of 50 the allowance period climbs up to 24 months at the age of 58, provided the claimant has contributed for at least 48 months. Claimants get 60% of their previous net salary (capped at the social security ceiling), or 67% for claimants with children. The maximum benefit is therefore 2382,60 euros (in 2021).

Unemployment benefit II 
If a worker is not eligible for the full unemployment benefits or after receiving the full unemployment benefit for the maximum of 12 months, he is able to apply for benefits from the so-called Hartz IV programme, an open-ended welfare programme. A person receiving Hartz IV benefits is paid 432 EUR (2020) a month for living expenses plus the cost of adequate housing (including heating) and health care. Couples can receive benefits for each partner including their children. Additionally, children can get "benefits for education and participation". Germany does not have an EBT (electronic benefits transfer) card system in place and, instead, disburses welfare in cash or via direct deposit onto the recipient's bank account.

Health insurance

Germany has a universal multi-payer health care system with two main types of health insurance: "Statutory Health Insurance" known as sickness funds (Krankenkasse) and "Private Health Insurance".

Health insurance is compulsory for the whole population in Germany. Salaried workers and employees below the relatively high income threshold of more than 60,000 euros per year are automatically enrolled into one of currently around 105 public non-profit "sickness funds" at common rates for all members, and is paid for with joint employer-employee contributions. Provider payment is negotiated in complex corporatist social bargaining among specified self-governed bodies (e.g. physicians' associations) at the level of federal states (Länder). The sickness funds are mandated to provide a unique and broad benefit package and cannot refuse membership or otherwise discriminate on an actuarial basis. Social welfare beneficiaries are also enrolled in statutory health insurance, and municipalities pay contributions on behalf of them.

Besides the "Statutory Health Insurance" covering the vast majority of residents, the better off with a yearly income above almost €50,000, students and civil servants for complementary coverage can opt for private health insurance (about 11% of the population). Most civil servants benefit from a tax-funded government employee benefit scheme covering a percentage of the costs, and cover the rest of the costs with a private insurance contract. Recently, private insurers provide various types of supplementary coverage as an add upon of the SHI benefit package (e.g. for glasses, coverage abroad and additional dental care or more sophisticated dentures).

The  health economics of Germany sector was about US$368.78 billion (€287.3 billion) in 2010, equivalent to 11.6 percent of gross domestic product (GDP) this year and about US$4,505 (€3,510) per capita. According to the World Health Organization, Germany's health care system was 77% government-funded and 23% privately funded as of 2004. In 2004 Germany ranked thirtieth in the world in life expectancy (78 years for men). It had a very low infant mortality rate (4.7 per 1,000 live births), and it was tied for eighth place in the number of practicing physicians, at 3.3 per 1,000 persons. In 2001 total spending on health amounted to 10.8 percent of gross domestic product.

Pensions

Child support
The child care system in Germany can be seen as universal in coverage, though regulations may vary from Land to Land, and between west Germany and east Germany. It is viewed as a public problem shared by multiple roles of the society: parents, regional and local governments, non-profit organizations (usually churches) etc. Germany offers a wide range of child care programs for parents: day care centers (Krippe) for children up to age 3,  preschool programs (Kindergarten) for children from age 3 to 6, primary schools (Hort) for school-age children. Around ninety-eight per cent of German daycare is non-for-profit and is heavily funded by the government. Ninety per cent of the costs are paid by state, regional and local governments through public taxes while the rest of the cost is paid by the parents. In western Germany, regulations of day care are enforced by state youth office (Landesjugendamt) in each Land, which distributes funds to day care centers according to a certain amount. Even though the enforcement is in a relatively decentralized form, there is still high conformity on regulatory requirements of the day care centers among different Land. For example, child/staff ratios vary from 17/1 to 25/1; group sizes of 25 in kindergartens; and training requirements for teachers. German child care system values highly of the quality of teaching staffs. In every German Land, a teacher must complete four to five years of training requirements, usually composed of one to two years of praktikum, two years of college, and one year of additional praktikum (Berufspraktikum). The tougher regulation on teachers' training requirements ensures the quality of child care service to some extent. There is no big market for private day care in Germany. Only 4% to 10% of mothers employ child minders (Tagespflege) in 1995. The main reason for this is that private child care providers cannot maintain profitability when facing the competition from the public providers which are generously funded by the government. And the high barrier to enter the market set by the government becomes one of the hinders.

Although general condition of the child care system can be applied to most of the cases and regions in Germany, there are noticeably big regional differences, especially between west and east Germany. The regional variations in child care supply reflect the fact that regulations are being made at the local community level. According to Tietze, Rossbach & Roitsch survey in 1994, there are variations in the supply of day care services between rural and urban areas, with rural areas being at a disadvantage. In east Germany, there are much larger number of day care slots than in west Germany and higher rate of child care provision, as an inheritance from its former socialist German Democratic Republic. The opening hours of the day-care centers vary as well. In west Germany the opening hours of Kindergarten are short, only for half of the day; while in east Germany 97% of the kindergarten offers all-day care including lunch. Child care policies in Germany focus more on children's development and equal opportunities to succeed after kindergarten rather than focusing on helping to solve the compatibility of work and family for parents. Thus it explains the fact that Germany aims to provide high-quality early education for children but set the opening hours of day care centers to be short and not convenient to the working parents.

In many social studies, child care policy together with social norms about gender roles have cast big impact on women's participation in labor force and fertility choice. Having one of the lowest fertility rate among European countries, Germany has on average 1.38 children per woman in 2008 and it keeps on having high level of childlessness among parents. Women in Germany, as in many other countries, face the dilemma between work and family. In west Germany, female participation in labor market is low as German income tax system discourages women from labor market due to high unemployment rate. Even for women who have jobs, they usually stop working at the birth of the child because mothers are seen as the best child care providers. 3-year period of parental leave is provided by the government, with low cash benefits paid under the terms of health insurance. Women tend to stay as housewives when kids are young and return to part-time works after their children grow older. Full-time employment rates are even lower. In east Germany, however, it witnesses one of the highest female labor participation rate among European countries. As high as 85 per cent of adult women, including those with young kids, participate in labor market. For working mothers, there are several informal child care arrangements they could have. Usually they have their children to be cared for by grandparents or other close relatives. Others send their kids to day care centers. 60% of east German children under age 3 are cared for by the day centers and over 90% of children aged 3 to 6 attend full-day preschool program.

Apart from maternity leave, parents are also entitled to a paid leave if their children are ill at home.

Funding
The social security system in Germany is funded through contributions paid by employees and employers. The contributions are paid on all direct wages as well as indirect wages up to a ceiling.

Notes

External links 
Social Security at a Glance, brochure by the German Ministry of Labour and Social Affairs, 2017